Washington's 20th legislative district is one of forty-nine districts in Washington state for representation in the state legislature.

The district includes a southern section of Thurston County, most of Lewis and Cowlitz counties, and the northern tip of Clark County.

This mostly rural district is represented by state senator John Braun and state representatives Peter Abbarno (position 1) and Ed Orcutt (position 2), all Republicans.

History 
The 20th District has not always been located in southwest Washington.  For example, as of 1917, when Republican Ina Phillips Williams took one of the House seats, it represented Yakima County in central Washington.

See also
Washington Redistricting Commission
Washington State Legislature
Washington State Senate
Washington House of Representatives
Washington (state) legislative districts

References

External links
Washington State Redistricting Commission
Washington House of Representatives
Map of Legislative Districts

20